Are You Being Served? is an Australian sitcom that is based on the British sitcom of the same name; it was produced by Network Ten. A total of 16 episodes were produced in two series, which aired in 1980 and 1981. The draw-card was the presence of actor John Inman reprising his role of Mr. Humphries from the original series. The other characters were all directly based on the regular characters in the show's original British version, but were all given new names. Hence there were no other returning original actors.

In comparison to the original series, Inman described this version of the series as "tighter - there's less padding."

For the opening theme, Inman himself performed vocals.

Premise
Audio samples of Are You Being Served? (media help)
Mr. Humphries (Inman) is sent to Australia by Mr. Grace to work temporarily for his Australian cousin Mr. Bone at Bone Brothers. Apart from the new setting and Australian rather than British characters, the characters and situation are almost identical to that of the original series, as are the set design and layout and even the costuming (down to the senior sales woman's ever-changing hair colours). Menswear and ladies apparel share a floor of a large city department store and the departments come into regular conflict. The staff on the floor are the pompous floor-walker Captain Wagstaff (Reg Gillam), crusty senior salesman Mr. Mankowitz (Anthony Bazell), randy sales junior Mr. Randel (Shane Bourne), strident older sales woman Mrs. Crawford (June Bronhill) and attractive but brassy and common younger sales woman Miss Buxton (Judith Woodroffe). Basil Clarke portrays the store's owner Mr. Bone, Reg Evans is the obnoxious cleaner Mr. Cocker, Kerry Daniel plays the nurse, and Tracey Kelly is Bone's attractive secretary.

Cast
 John Inman as Mr. Humphries
 June Bronhill as Mrs. Crawford
 Reg Gillam as Captain Wagstaff
 Judith Woodroffe as Miss Buxton
 Christine Amor as Miss Nicholls
 Tony Bazell as Mr. Mankowitz
 Shane Bourne as Mr. Randel
 Peter Collingwood as Mr. Dunkley
 Ken Fraser as Mr. Fenwick
 Basil Clarke as Young Mr. Bone
 Reg Evans as Mr. Cocker
 Kerry Daniel as Young Mr. Bone's Nurse
 Tracey Kelly as Young Mr. Bone's Secretary
 Bernadette Gibson as the Canteen Manageress
Both Judith Woodroffe (Miss Buxton) and Peter Collingwood (Mr. Dunkley) were unavailable for series two so they were replaced with Miss Nicholls (Christine Amor) and Mr. Fenwick (Ken Fraser) respectively.

Character similarities with the original series
 Mrs. Crawford = Mrs. Slocombe
 Captain Wagstaff = Captain Peacock
 Miss Buxton/Miss Nicholls = Miss Brahms
 Mr. Mankowitz = Mr. Grainger (with some characteristics of Mr. Goldberg)
 Mr. Randel = Mr. Lucas/Mr. Spooner
 Mr. Dunkley/Mr. Fenwick = Mr. Rumbold
 Young Mr. Bone = Young Mr. Grace

Production notes
The first series was produced at the ATV-0 studios in Melbourne in the early months of 1980.

It was the first television role for opera singer June Bronhill. (Her first straight dramatic acting role had been in a theatre production the previous year.) John Inman said, "It's amazing to think this is her first television role, she's a natural." Bronhill discussed the role with TV Week magazine. "I'm delighted with the way my character has turned out. Mrs. Crawford tries to be very refined but sometimes the ocker in her slips out. The British version of Are You Being Served? has always been my favourite comedy series. And I loved Mollie Sugden's performance as Mrs. Slocombe, my counterpart."

For the second and final series, produced in late 1980, original regular cast members Judith Woodroffe, who was Mrs. Crawford's attractive junior Miss Buxton, and Peter Collingwood who had played the Mr. Rumbold-like store manager Mr. Dunkley, were unavailable. To replace them, Christine Amor was the new, brassy young female retail assistant Miss Nicholls, and Ken Fraser came in as Mr. Fenwick.

Christine Amor said of the series that "Are You Being Served? is one of the few TV comedies we are making in Australia and that's sad. In the days of My Name's McGooley, What's Yours? we had real Australian humour. But we have been very much influenced by overseas countries. Are You Being Served? is popular because people identify with a department store. It has no Australian idioms and it is a take off of the English series, but there is this sort of colonial thing where people enjoy English humour. I've always enjoyed it. I like English comedies, I think they're far superior to American comedies." It was Amor's first acting job before a live television audience. "I look at John Inman because he's been doing TV comedy for 10 years and been a comedian for 25 years. He's got it down to a fine art. But it is an accomplished skill which you keep on learning. I've learned a lot from John. The basic hint he gave me was to enjoy it and to have a rapport with the audience."

Actress Abigail guest starred in one episode as a perfume company sales woman installed on the shop floor, whose presence disturbs the head of men's wear and the head of ladies' wear. Abigail's character then does a strip tease to reveal a skimpy costume. Abigail said of the guest spot that "I took this role because I very much wanted to work with John Inman and I have a high regard for the series itself. Besides, I thought it would be a fun proposition."

Episode list
Except for "Undesirable Alien", the plot of each episode is based on the corresponding episode of the original series.

Season 1
 Ep1: Get Fit Down Under, Mr. Humphries (based on "Strong Stuff, This Insurance")
 Ep2: The Hero
 Ep3: Mrs. Crawford, Senior Person
 Ep4: The Agent
 Ep5: The Apartment
 Ep6: The Junior
 Ep7: The Punch and Judy Affair
 Ep8: Anything You Can Do

Season 2
 Ep9: Dear Sexy Knickers
 Ep10: Camping In
 Ep11: Our Figures Are Slipping
 Ep12: Heir Apparent
 Ep13: Front Page Story
 Ep14: Undesirable Alien
 Ep15: Diamonds are a Man's Best Friend
 Ep16: His and Hers

Legacy
The series never ran outside of Australia and thus was not seen in the UK or other countries where Are You Being Served? was popular, such as Ireland, the United States, Canada, and New Zealand.

The series has not been repeated on Australian television since the late 1980s. (The UK original Are You Being Served? had been repeated by ABC Television in Australia several times. By 1978 it had been repeated by Channel Seven in Australia to even larger audiences.)

In a recurring joke on the radio show Get This, it was stated that only the loss of the master tapes for the series is preventing its release on DVD. The National Film and Sound Archive does in fact contain copies of each episode in its vault.

Most of the episodes are available on YouTube.

Notes

External links
Are You Being Served? at the National Film and Sound Archive
 

Are You Being Served?
Australian television sitcoms
Network 10 original programming
1980 Australian television series debuts
1981 Australian television series endings
Australian television series based on British television series
David Croft sitcoms
Australian workplace comedy television series
1980s LGBT-related sitcoms